Sophia Eleonore of Hesse-Darmstadt (7 January 1634 in Darmstadt – 7 October 1663 in Bingenheim, now part of Echzell), was Landgravine of Hesse-Darmstadt by birth and by marriage Landgravine of Hesse-Homburg.

She was a daughter of Landgrave George II of Hesse-Darmstadt (1605–1661) from his marriage to Sophia Eleonore (1609–1671), the daughter of Elector John George I of Saxony.

Life 
In Darmstadt on 21 April 1650 Sophia Eleonore married to her cousin, Landgrave William Christoph of Hesse-Homburg (1625–1681). On the occasion of her wedding, her father gave her the district of Castle Bingenheim.  William Christoph preferred Bingenheim to his castle in Homburg, so the family mostly lived in Bingenheim and William Christoph was sometimes called the Landgrave of Hesse-Bingenheim. Her father had promised that her male descendants would be allowed to keep Bingenheim after her death, however, only two daughters survived their father. This led to a dispute between Hesse-Darmstadt and Hesse-Homburg about the ownership of Bingenheim, which was finally settled by Elisabeth Dorothea, who was acting as regent of Hesse-Darmstadt.

Issue 
Sophia Eleonore gave birth 13 children, but only 4 survived infancy:
Frederick, Hereditary Landgrave of Hesse-Homburg (Darmstadt, 12 March 1651 – Homburg v.d.Höhe, 27 July 1651).
Christine Wilhelmine (Bingenheim, 30 June 1653 – Grabow, 16 May 1722), married Frederick, Duke of Mecklenburg-Grabow.
Leopold George, Hereditary Landgrave of Hesse-Homburg (Bingenheim, 25 October 1654 – Schloss Gravenstein, Schleswig-Holstein, 26 February 1675), died unmarried.
Frederick (Bingenheim, 5 September 1655 – Bingenheim, 6 September 1655).
William (Bingenheim, 13 August 1656 – Bingenheim, 4 September 1656).
Anna Catherina Homberg (23 June 1657-1718), married Martinus Simon
Charles William (Bingenheim, 6 May 1658 – Bingenheim, 13 December 1658).
Philipp (Bingenheim, 20 June 1659 – Bingenheim, 6 October 1659).
Magdalene Sophie (Bingenheim, 24 April 1660 – Braunfels, 22 March 1720), married William Maurice, Count of Solms-Braunfels; among their children: Christine Charlotte of Solms-Braunfels and Frederick William, Prince of Solms-Braunfels.
Stillborn son (7 June 1661).
Frederick William (Bingenheim, 29 November 1662 – Homburg, 5 March 1663).
Stillborn son (7 October 1663).

She died in Bingenheim aged 29, following complications in her last childbirth.

Notes

References 
 Johann I. von Gerning: Die Lahn- und Main-Gegenden von Embs bis Frankfurt, p. 148, Online

House of Hesse
1634 births
1663 deaths
Landgravines of Hesse-Darmstadt
Deaths in childbirth
Daughters of monarchs